The 1975–76 DDR-Oberliga was the 27th season of the DDR-Oberliga, the first tier of league football in East Germany.

The league was contested by fourteen teams. Dynamo Dresden won the championship, the club's fourth of eight East German championships. The 1975–76 championship marked the beginning of a new era in the Oberliga with fifteen consecutive league titles between 1975 and 1990 going to the Dynamo clubs, Dynamo Dresden and BFC Dynamo.

Hans-Jürgen Kreische of Dynamo Dresden was the league's top scorer with 24 goals, the record fourth time for Kreische to finish as league top scorer, while Jürgen Croy of BSG Sachsenring Zwickau won the seasons East German Footballer of the year award.

On the strength of the 1975–76 title Dresden qualified for the 1976–77 European Cup where the club was knocked out by FC Zürich in the quarter finals. Fourth-placed club 1. FC Lokomotive Leipzig qualified for the 1976–77 European Cup Winners' Cup as the seasons FDGB-Pokal winners and was knocked out by Heart of Midlothian in the first round. Second-placed BFC Dynamo qualified for the 1976–77 UEFA Cup where it was knocked out in the first round by Shakhtar Donetsk while third-placed 1. FC Magdeburg lost to Juventus in the quarter finals.

Table									
The 1975–76 season saw two newly promoted clubs BSG Chemie Leipzig and BSG Energie Cottbus.

Results

References

Sources

External links
 Das Deutsche Fussball Archiv  Historic German league tables

1975–76 in German football leagues
1
1975-76